Coenraad Lodewijk Walther Boer (2 August 1891 – 15 March 1984) was a Dutch composer. His work was part of the music event in the art competition at the 1932 Summer Olympics.

References

Further reading
 Albert van der Schoot: Kapitein Walther Boer en het galaconcert, BoekenGilde 2019, 
 Nijgh & Van Ditmar: Onze Musici, 1923, p. 16 (refers to him as Louis Boer, the name he mostly used before World War II)
 Geïllustreerd muzieklexicon (ed. G. Keller and Philip Kruseman, with contributions from Sem Dresden, Wouter Hutschenruijter, Willem Landré, Alexander Voormolen and Henri Zagwijn); 1932/1949, J. Philips Kruseman, Den Haag; p. 67
 Jozef Robijns, Miep Zijlstra: Algemene muziekencyclopedie, Haarlem: De Haan, (1979)-1984, 
 Wolfgang Suppan, Armin Suppan: Das Neue Lexikon des Blasmusikwesens, 2nd, 3rd and 4th editions, 1976, 1988 , 1994 , Freiburg-Tiengen, Blasmusikverlag Schulz GmbH
 Paul Frank, Burchard Bulling, Florian Noetzel, Helmut Rosner: Kurzgefasstes Tonkünstler Lexikon - Zweiter Teil: Ergänzungen und Erweiterungen seit 1937, 15th edition, Wilhelmshaven: Heinrichshofen, Band 1: A-K. 1974. ; Band 2: L-Z. 1976. 

1891 births
1984 deaths
Dutch composers
Olympic competitors in art competitions
Musicians from The Hague